Gotland Brigade (MekB 18), was a Swedish Army armoured brigade within the Swedish Armed Forces and acted in different forms between 1949 and 2000. The main parts of the basic training were held at the Gotland Regiment (P 18) within the Gotland Garrison in Visby, Gotland.

History
The Gotland Brigade was raised as an infantry brigade during the years 1949–1951 under the name, Gotland Brigade (IB 18). This was organized through the Defence Act of 1948, where Gotland Infantry Regiment (I 18) was converted into a brigade.

In 1963, when the reorganization into the Pansarbrigad 63 ("Armoured Brigade 63) was commenced within the Swedish Army, it was decided that Göta Life Guards' (P 1) detachment, the Göta Armoured Life Guards' Company in Gotland (P 1 G), would be amalgamated with the Gotland Infantry Regiment (I 18). Through the amalgamation, Gotland Regiment (P 18) was formed and the Gotland Brigade was converted from an infantry brigade into an armoured brigade. The brigade became a model-type of the Armoured Brigade Gotland (Pansarbrigad Gotland, PB Gotland) in 1966, while the other active Swedish armoured brigades became a model-type of the Armoured Brigade 63 (Pansarbrigad 63, PB 63). The brigade also received its new designation, PB 18.

In 1982, the brigade together with the other units on Gotland was amalgamated into the Gotland Military Command (MKG). In 1994, the brigade was separated along with the regiment from the command and became a cadre-organized war unit in the Middle Military Area (Milo M) from 1 July, under the new name Gotland Regiment and Gotland Brigade (MekB 18). In the same year the brigade was supplied with Pansarbandvagn 302 and Stridsvagn 104 from Kristianstad Brigade (Kristianstadsbrigaden, PB 26), which was disbanded as a result of the Defence Act of 1992.

The Gotland Regiment and Gotland Brigade (MekB 18) were disbanded as a result of the disarmament policies set forward in the Defence Act of 2000 and on 1 July 2000 it adopted the name, Gotland Regiment (P 18).

Order of battle
The Gotland Brigade did not control any units during peacetime. All units assigned to it in war were trained and maintained by the Gotland Regiment and Gotland Artillery Regiment in Visby.

 PB 18 - Gotland Brigade (Gotlandsbrigaden) in Visby:
 Brigade Headquarters and Headquarters Company
 1st Armoured Battalion with a headquarters company, 12x Stridsvagn 102R tanks in one company, 28x KP-car m/42 wheeled armoured personnel carriers and 24x Rifle Squads with 8x Pvpj 1110 90mm recoilless rifles in two companies, 4x M/40 105mm howitzers in an artillery battery and a logistics company
 2nd Armoured Battalion with a headquarters company, 12x Stridsvagn 102R tanks in one company, 28x KP-car m/42 wheeled armoured personnel carriers and 24x Rifle Squads with 8x Pvpj 1110 90mm recoilless rifles in two companies, 4x M/40 105mm howitzers in an artillery battery and a logistics company
 3rd Armoured Battalion with a headquarters company, 12x Stridsvagn 102R tanks in one company, 28x KP-car m/42 wheeled armoured personnel carriers and 24x Rifle Squads with 8x Pvpj 1110 90mm recoilless rifles in two companies, 4x M/40 105mm howitzers in an artillery battery and a logistics company
 Artillery Battalion with 12x 155mm Haubits m/F towed howitzers
 18th Armoured Reconnaissance Company with 6x KP-car m/42 wheeled armoured personnel carriers, 12x Jeeps, 12x Recon Teams, 2x Rifle Squads and 4x Pvpj 1110 90mm recoilless rifles
 18th Anti-tank Company with Carl Gustaf 8.4cm recoilless rifles and Bantam anti-tank missiles
 18th Engineer Company
 Logistic Battalion

Heraldry and traditions
The Gotland Brigade shared heraldry and traditions with Gotland Regiment. In 1994–2000, the brigade managed the traditions of the regiment.

Coat of arms
The coat of the arms of the Gotland Regiment and Gotland Brigade (MekB 18) 1994–2000. It was also used by the Gotland Regiment (P 18) 1977–1994 and 2000–2004. Blazon: "Azure, a ram passant argent, armed or, banner gules with crosstaff, edging and five flaps or. The shield surmounted two arms in fess, embowed and vambraced, the hands holding swords in saltire, or".

Commanding officers
Commanding officers:
1983-10-01 – 1988-09-30: COL Stig Barke
1988-10-01 – 1992-06-30: COL Anders Sifvertsson
1992-07-01 – 1994-12-31: LTC/COL Karlis Neretnieks
1995-01-01 – 1999-05-31: COL Sven-Olof "Olle" Broman
1999-06-01 – 2000-06-30: COL Peter Molin

Names, designations and locations

See also
 Gotland Regiment
 Military on Gotland
 List of Swedish Army brigades

Footnotes

References

Notes

Print

Further reading

Brigades of the Swedish Army
Disbanded units and formations of Sweden
Military units and formations established in 1949
Military units and formations disestablished in 2000
Visby Garrison
1949 establishments in Sweden
2000 disestablishments in Sweden